The Third Cabinet of Kim Kielsen was the Government of Greenland, in office between 27 October 2016 and 15 May 2018, where it was dissolved following a general election. It was a coalition majority government consisting of Siumut, Inuit Ataqatigiit and Partii Naleraq.

List of ministers
The Social Democratic Siumut had 5 ministers including the Premier. The Socialistic Inuit Ataqatigiit had 4 ministers. The Centrist party had 1 minister.

|}

Party breakdown 
Party breakdown of cabinet ministers:

See also 
Cabinet of Greenland

References

 

Government of Greenland
Coalition governments
Politics of Greenland
Political organisations based in Greenland
Kielsen, Kim 2
2016 establishments in Greenland
Cabinets established in 2016
2016 in Greenland
Greenland politics-related lists